Bev Sage is a British artist, singer/songwriter and Creative Director. Sage and Steve Fairnie were the 1980s electronic pop-duo the Techno Twins (also known as The Technos). Sage had UK chart success with "Falling in Love Again" and was a featured artist on the Modern Romance song "Queen of the Rapping Scene (Nothing Ever Goes the Way You Plan)", which reached #37 in the UK Singles Chart and which she performed on Top of the Pops. Sage's vocals were also recorded for Monty Python's film The Meaning of Life, and has featured in numerous other music of other music and arts projects.

Sage's work as an Art Director has led her to styling live shows such as The Blue Brothers, and directing fashion shows at numerous venues including the Saatchi Gallery London and the Recycled Fashion Show for Cancer Research UK, London.  Sage has also worked in television; presenting, directing and producing arts shows for the BBC and ITV. Sage is currently studying Fine Art at the Art Academy in London.

References

English women singers
Living people
Year of birth missing (living people)
Women new wave singers